This is a list of National Natural Landmarks in the U.S. state of Colorado.

There are 16 National Natural Landmarks in Colorado, one of which extends into Wyoming. They cover areas of geological, biological and historical importance, and include lakes, mountains, rock formations and numerous fossil sites. The landmarks are located in 14 of the state's 64 counties. Four counties each contain all or part of two NNLs, while two landmarks are split between two counties. The first two designations, Slumgullion Earthflow and Summit Lake, were made in 1965, while the most recent designation, Sulphur Cave and Spring, was made in 2021. Owners include private individuals and several municipal, state and federal agencies.

The National Natural Landmarks Program is administered by the National Park Service, a branch of the Department of the Interior. The National Park Service determines which properties meet NNL criteria and, after notifying the owners, makes nomination recommendations. The Secretary of the Interior reviews nominations and, based on a set of predetermined criteria, makes a decision on NNL designation or a determination of eligibility for designation. Both public and privately owned properties can be designated as NNLs. Owners may object to the nomination of the property as a NNL. This designation provides indirect, partial protection of the historic integrity of the properties via tax incentives, grants, monitoring of threats, and other means.

National Natural Landmarks

See also

Bibliography of Colorado
Index of Colorado-related articles
Outline of Colorado
Geography of Colorado
List of protected areas of Colorado

References
 General
 

Specific

External links

Colorado state government website
Colorado Department of Natural Resources website
Colorado Geological Survey website
United States federal government website
United States Department of the Interior website
National Park Service website
National Natural Landmarks Program

 
Colorado geography-related lists
Environment of Colorado
Protected areas of Colorado
Tourist attractions in Colorado
Colorado, List of national natural landmarks in
Colorado, List of national natural landmarks in
Colorado, List of national natural landmarks in